"I'm Beautiful Dammitt!" (sometimes printed without punctuation, sometimes simply titled "I'm Beautiful") was the second single released from the Uncanny Alliance LP, The Groove Won't Bite, released as a CD single and 12".

Versions and remixes 
 «I’m Beautiful Dammitt!» (Club Vocal) — 7:41
 «I’m Beautiful Dammitt!» (Fierce Dub) — 6:09
 «I’m Beautiful Dammitt!» (Radio Version) — 3:41
 «I’m Beautiful Dammitt!» (Radio Club Mix) — 4:21
 «I’m Beautiful Dammitt!» (DJ EFX's San Tranzdisko Mix) — 11:35	
 «I’m Beautiful Dammitt!» (3rd Floor's Vox Mix)	
 «I’m Beautiful Dammitt!» (Digi Dubb Mix)
 «I’m Beautiful Dammitt!» (Urban Instrumental)	
 «I’m Beautiful Dammitt!» (I Got A Job Mix)
 «I’m Beautiful Dammitt!» (3rd Floor Mix)

Charts

Bette Midler version

In 1998 singer Bette Midler covered the song, retitled simply "I'm Beautiful", for her album Bathhouse Betty. That album, the title of which references her time as a performer in gay bathhouses, was catered to the gay community. As such she revised the lyrics to the song to be more specifically directed towards the struggle of gay people to be accepted. In particular there is the new lyric: "'Go away little boy' all the kids say! Everybody on the block says they think you're gay!" The song was released as a single in 1999 with numerous dance remixes, one of which reached #1 on the U.S. Hot Dance Club Play Chart, and #8 on the Hot Dance Music/Maxi Singles Sales.

Track listing 

12": USA (Warner Bros 0-44586)
 "I'm Beautiful" (Danny Tenaglia Continental Club Mix)
 "I'm Beautiful" (Brinsley Evans Back To The Scene Of The Crime Mix)
 "I'm Beautiful" (Victor Calderone Main Vocal Mix)
 "I'm Beautiful" (Album Version)
 "I'm Beautiful" (Danny's D-Tour Dub)
 "I'm Beautiful" (Lil' D-Tour Groove)
 "I'm Beautiful" (Victor Calderone Dub)
 "I'm Beautiful" (Victor Calderone Drum Dub)

CDM: USA (Warner 2-44586)
 "I'm Beautiful" (Album Version)
 "I'm Beautiful" (Danny Tenaglia Continental Club Mix)
 "I'm Beautiful" (Victor Calderone Main Vocal Mix)
 "I'm Beautiful" (Brinsley Evans Back To The Scene Of The Crime Mix)
 "I'm Beautiful" (Danny's D-Tour Dub)
 "I'm Beautiful" (Victor Calderone Dub)
 "I'm Beautiful" (Lil' D-Tour Groove)
 "I'm Beautiful" (Victor Calderone Drum Dub)

12": USA (Warner PRO-A-9587) Promo
 "I'm Beautiful" (Victor Calderone Main Vocal Mix)
 "I'm Beautiful" (Victor Calderone Dub)
 "I'm Beautiful" (Victor Calderone Drum Dub)

12": USA (Warner PRO-A-9591) Promo
 "I'm Beautiful" (Danny Tenaglia Continental Club Mix)
 "I'm Beautiful" (Brinsley Evans Back To The Scene Of The Crime Mix)
 "I'm Beautiful" (Danny's D-Tour Dub)
 "I'm Beautiful" (Lil' D-Tour Groove)

12": USA (Warner) Promo
 "I'm Beautiful" (Danny Tenaglia Continental Club Mix)
 "I'm Beautiful" (Danny's D-Tour Dub)
 "I'm Beautiful" (Victor Calderone Main Vocal Mix)
 "I'm Beautiful" (Victor Calderone Dub)
 "I'm Beautiful" (Brinsley Evans Back To The Scene Of The Crime Mix)

Charts

See also
 List of number-one dance singles of 1999 (U.S.)

References

Uncanny Alliance songs
Bette Midler songs
1993 singles
1999 singles
LGBT-related songs
Songs against racism and xenophobia
1993 songs
A&M Records singles
Warner Records singles
Song recordings produced by Arif Mardin